San Wai or San Wai Tsuen is a village in the San Tin area of Yuen Long District, Hong Kong.

Administration
San Wai is one of the villages represented within the San Tin Rural Committee. For electoral purposes, San Wai is part of the San Tin constituency, which is currently represented by Man Fu-wan.

San Tin Ha San Wai and San Tin Sheung San Wai, part of San Wai, are recognized villages under the New Territories Small House Policy.

History
San Wai Tsuen was originally called Fuk Hing Lei, and was founded by the Wong and Chiu families.

Further reading

References

External links

 Delineation of area of existing village San Wai (I) (San Tin) for election of resident representative (2019 to 2022)
 Delineation of area of existing village San Wai (II) (San Tin) for election of resident representative (2019 to 2022)
 Antiquities Advisory Board. Historic Building Appraisal. No. 35 San Wai Tsuen. Pictures
 Antiquities Advisory Board. Historic Building Appraisal. No. 36 San Wai Tsuen. Pictures
 Antiquities Advisory Board. Historic Building Appraisal. No. 50 San Wai Tsuen. Pictures
 Antiquities Advisory Board. Historic Building Appraisal. No. 51 San Wai Tsuen. Pictures
 Antiquities Advisory Board. Historic Building Appraisal. No. 57 San Wai Tsuen. Pictures
 Antiquities Advisory Board. Historic Building Appraisal. No. 60 San Wai Tsuen. Pictures
 Antiquities Advisory Board. Historic Building Appraisal. Hon Lo, No. 61 San Wai Tsuen. Pictures
 Antiquities Advisory Board. Historic Building Appraisal. No. 62 San Wai Tsuen. Pictures
 Antiquities Advisory Board. Historic Building Appraisal. No. 70 San Wai Tsuen. Pictures
 Antiquities Advisory Board. Historic Building Appraisal. No. 71 San Wai Tsuen. Pictures
 Antiquities Advisory Board. Historic Building Appraisal. No. 87 San Wai Tsuen. Pictures
 

Villages in Yuen Long District, Hong Kong
San Tin